Jaime of Braganza (1479 – 20 September 1532) was the 4th Duke of Braganza and the 2nd Duke of Guimarães, among other titles. He is known for reviving the wealth and power of the House of Braganza which had been confiscated by King John II of Portugal.

Life 
Born in 1479, Jaime I of Braganza was young when he witnessed the arrest and execution of his father, Fernando II, Duke of Braganza, and of his uncle, Diogo, Duke of Viseu and Duke of Beja. They were both executed for treason when King John II discovered a plot among the nobility against the Crown. After his father's death, Jaime's family, the House of Braganza, were banished to Castile and their properties and vast wealth were seized by the Portuguese Crown.

After King John II's death in 1495, the throne passed to his first cousin, King Manuel I of Portugal. In 1498, King Manuel I, having been a powerful nobleman before his ascension to the throne, forgave the House of Braganza and welcomed them back to Portugal. He returned all their possessions and then some, but demanded devout loyalty from Duke Jaime of Braganza. Seeking to demonstrate the power of the House of Braganza after his wealth was returned, Jaime declined to live at Vila Viçosa Castle (owing to its association with his father's betrayal and murder) and built the Ducal Palace of Vila Viçosa as his seat. It was a sumptuous Portuguese Renaissance palace in the Alentejo province of Portugal.

Royal favour 
Later in 1498, King Manuel I was to go on a diplomatic journey to Castile. This was shortly after Portugal had witnessed a succession crisis, and the King, who had no heirs, saw to it that Parliament (the Cortes) named Jaime, son of his sister Isabella of Viseu, as heir presumptive to the throne of Portugal.

Duke Jaime married Leonor Pérez de Guzmán, daughter of Juan Alfonso Pérez de Guzmán, 3rd Duke of Medina Sidonia. She was murdered in 1512 by order of Jaime who suspected her of adultery. King Manuel I decided that his nephew Jaime, in order to escape imprisonment for this crime, would have to prepare and fully finance a fleet to conquer the city of Azamor, on the Moroccan Atlantic coast. The city was easily conquered by the Duke's forces and he returned to Portugal forgiven and a hero.

Marriages and children
In 1500, Jaime of Braganza had married Leonor Pérez de Guzmán, daughter of Juan Alfonso Pérez de Guzmán, 3rd Duke of Medina Sidonia. They had two children before she was murdered in 1512.

In 1520, Jaime I married Joana of Mendoça, daughter of Diogo of Mendonça, High-Alcaide of Mourão. They had eight children, most of whom saw successful lives.

Ancestry

See also
List of Dukes of Braganza

Bibliography
”Nobreza de Portugal e do Brasil” – Vol. II, page 442 to 445. Published by Zairol Lda., Lisbon 1989.

External links

1479 births
1532 deaths
House of Braganza
Dukes of Braganza
102
Portuguese nobility